Hiroyuki Hamada may refer to:
 Hiroyuki Hamada (martial artist) (1925–2003), Japanese martial artist
 Hiroyuki Hamada (artist) (born 1968), Japanese-born American artist